Wheel In Motion is a 1992 live concert video by the Scottish Celtic rock band Runrig. It shows footage from the 1991 Loch Lomond concert, and various others from the tour of the same year. Originally released on VHS in 1992, it was remastered onto DVD in 2000.

Track listing 
Always The Winner
Solus Na Madainn (The Morning Light)
Healer In Your Heart
Every River
Harvest Moon
Hearthammer
Abhainn An T-Sluaigh (The Crowded River)
Headlights
Edge Of The World
Alba (Scotland)
Instrumental
An Cuibhle Mòr (The Big Wheel)
I'll Keep Coming Home
Tear Down These Walls
Pride Of The Summer
Flower Of The West
Loch Lomond
This Beautiful Pain

Runrig albums
1992 live albums
1992 video albums
Live video albums
Scottish Gaelic music